Robert Sacre (born June 6, 1989) is an American-Canadian professional basketball player who is the assistant general manager for the Vancouver Bandits of the Canadian Elite Basketball League (CEBL). A dual citizen of both the United States and Canada, he has played for the Canadian national basketball team. After playing college basketball for the Gonzaga Bulldogs, he was selected by the Los Angeles Lakers with the last overall pick in the second round of the 2012 NBA draft. He played four seasons with the Lakers and three seasons with the Sun Rockers Shibuya in Japan.

Early life
Sacre was born in the United States in Baton Rouge, Louisiana to former National Football League player Greg LaFleur and former LSU Lady Tigers college basketball player Leslie Sacre. His mother, a Canadian, decided to move back to Canada when Sacre was seven, and raised her son as a single mother. Leslie only insisted that he learn to swim, and she did not push him to play basketball.

Sacre was one of the top high school players in Canada. In his junior year, he led Handsworth Secondary School to the British Columbia Provincial Championship; he was named MVP of the title game after scoring 17 points, grabbing 12 rebounds, and blocking four shots. In that same year he was selected to play for the Canadian Junior National team at the 2005 Global Games and the 2006 World Championship qualifiers.  In his senior year he averaged 25 points, 12 rebounds, and four and a half blocks per game.

Considered a four-star recruit by Rivals.com, Sacre was listed as the No. 10 center and the No. 102 player in the nation in 2007.

College career

Sacre committed to NCAA Division I squad Gonzaga University prior to the 2007–08 season. He came off the bench in his freshman season, averaging nine minutes of action per game in 2007-08.  In 2008–09, he broke his foot three games into the season and was later granted a medical redshirt.

Sacre came back strong in the 2009-10 season, averaging 10.3 points, 5.4 rebounds, and 1.9 blocks per game as the Bulldogs' starting centre.

In 2012, Sacre finished his career with 1,270 points. He also grabbed 679 career rebounds and had 186 career blocks.

Professional career

Los Angeles Lakers (2012–2016)

On June 28, 2012, the Los Angeles Lakers selected Sacre with the last pick (60th) in the 2012 NBA draft. After joining the Lakers for the 2012 NBA Summer League, he signed with the Lakers on September 7. On October 31, he made his NBA debut against the Portland Trail Blazers, playing 49 seconds in a 116-106 loss. He scored his first points on November 4, 2012, in a victory against the Detroit Pistons. On January 8, 2013, Sacre made his first career start, finishing with 10 points, four blocked shots and three rebounds in a 125–112 loss to the Houston Rockets. During his rookie season, he had multiple assignments with the Los Angeles D-Fenders of the NBA Development League.

On July 10, 2013, Sacre re-signed with the Lakers to a three-year deal and joined them for the 2013 NBA Summer League. On February 5, 2014, Sacre was involved in a bizarre game after receiving his sixth foul during a game against the Cleveland Cavaliers. The Lakers had dressed eight players, losing guards Jordan Farmar and Nick Young to injury during the course of the game. With Chris Kaman having already fouled out and coach Mike D'Antoni electing not to play Steve Nash, the Lakers roster had been trimmed down to four eligible players after Sacre committed his sixth foul. In accordance to league rules, Sacre was allowed to stay in the game after being assessed a technical foul on top of the sixth personal foul he committed.

On September 22, 2016, Sacre signed with the New Orleans Pelicans. However, he was later waived by the Pelicans on October 21 after appearing in one preseason game.

Sun Rockers Shibuya (2017–2019) 
On January 7, 2017, Sacre signed with Hitachi SunRockers Tokyo-Shibuya of the Japanese B.League.

Executive career 
On March 11, 2021, Sacre was announced as the assistant general manager for the Fraser Valley Bandits of the Canadian Elite Basketball League (CEBL).

National team career
Sacre played several tournaments for the Canadian junior team. He averaged 9 points, 8.2 rebounds, and 3 blocks per game at the 2006 FIBA Americas Under-18 Championship, helping the Canadians to a fourth-place finish in the tournament. Sacre was called to the senior national team for the first time to participate at the 2010 FIBA World Championship in Turkey. He also played at the 2015 FIBA Americas Championship in Mexico.

Career statistics

NBA

Regular season

|-
| align="left" | 
| align="left" | L.A. Lakers
| 32 || 3 || 6.3 || .375 || .000 || .636 || 1.1 || .2 || .0 || .3 || 1.3
|-
| align="left" | 
| align="left" | L.A. Lakers
| 65 || 13 || 16.8 || .477 || .000 || .681 || 3.9 || .8 || .4 || .7 || 5.4
|-
| align="left" | 
| align="left" | L.A. Lakers
| 67 || 18 || 16.9 || .412 || .000 || .671 || 3.5 || .8 || .4 || .6 || 4.6
|-
| align="left" | 
| align="left" | L.A. Lakers
| 25 || 1 || 12.8 || .413 || .000 || .658 || 2.9 || .6 || .2 || .4 || 3.5
|- class="sortbottom"
| style="text-align:center;" colspan="2"| Career
| 189 || 35 || 14.5 || .436 || .000 || .671 || 3.1 || .7 || .3 || .6 || 4.2

Playoffs

|-
| align="left" | 2013
| align="left" | L.A. Lakers
| 2 || 0 || 2.0 || .000 || .000 || .000 || 1.0 || .0 || .5 || .0 || .0
|- class="sortbottom"
| style="text-align:center;" colspan="2"| Career
| 2 || 0 || 2.0 || .000 || .000 || .000 || 1.0 || .0 || .5 || .0 || .0

B.League

|-
| align="left" | 2016–17
| align="left" | Shibuya
| 32 || 32 || 29.4 || .431 || .000 || .787 || 8.8 || 1.3 || .9 || .7 ||15.0
|-
| align="left" | 2017–18
| align="left" | Shibuya
| 60 || 58 || 26.4 || .482 || .308 || .750 || 7.5 || 1.4 || .7 || .7 ||16.5
|-
| align="left" | 2018–19
| align="left" | Shibuya
| 60 || 60 || 33.9 || .518 || .250 || .781 || 9.2 || 1.5 || .8 || .9 ||19.4
|-

College

|-
| align="left" | 2007–08
| align="left" | Gonzaga
| 28 || 10 || 9.6 || .444 ||  || .634 || 1.9 || .3 || .3 || .2 || 2.9
|-
| align="left" | 2008–09
| align="left" | Gonzaga
| 5 || 0 || 8.8 || .714 ||  || .625 || 2.8 || .0 || .2 || .4 || 3.0
|-
| align="left" | 2009–10
| align="left" | Gonzaga
| 34 || 33 || 25.2 || .526 || 1.000 || .629 || 5.4 || .6 || .7 || 1.9 || 10.3
|-
| align="left" | 2010–11
| align="left" | Gonzaga
| 35 || 35 || 25.9 || .488 || .000 || .823 || 6.3 || 1.1 || .8 || 1.9 || 12.5
|-
| align="left" | 2011–12
| align="left" | Gonzaga
| 33 || 33 || 26.3 || .511 || .000 || .761 || 6.3 || .7 || .4 || 1.4 || 11.6
|- class="sortbottom"
| style="text-align:left;"| Career
| style="text-align:left;"|
| 135 || 111 || 21.8 || .503 || .250 || .734 || 5.0 || .7 || .5 || 1.4 || 9.4

See also

 List of Canadians in the National Basketball Association

References

External links

 

1989 births
Living people
2010 FIBA World Championship players
African-American basketball players
American expatriate basketball people in Japan
American men's basketball players
American people of Canadian descent
Basketball people from British Columbia
Basketball players from Baton Rouge, Louisiana
Black Canadian basketball players
Canadian expatriate basketball people in Japan
Canadian men's basketball players
Canadian people of African-American descent
Centers (basketball)
Gonzaga Bulldogs men's basketball players
Los Angeles D-Fenders players
Los Angeles Lakers draft picks
Los Angeles Lakers players
National Basketball Association players from Canada
People from North Vancouver
Sun Rockers Shibuya players
20th-century African-American people